The Sidney Hillman Foundation is an American charitable foundation that awards prizes to journalists who investigate issues related to social justice and progressive public policy. The foundation, founded in 1946, is named for Sidney Hillman, who was the founding president of the Amalgamated Clothing Workers of America. The foundation awards the annual Hillman Prize and the monthly Sidney Awards. The Foundation is headed by Bruce S. Raynor, former Executive Vice President of the SEIU.

Hillman Prize

The Hillman Prize  is a journalism award given out annually by the foundation. It recognizes journalists and public figures for socially responsible journalism, both in traditional and new media forms. Past winners include both established and emerging  figures in their fields. Murray Kempton was the first recipient in 1950. Each winner receives $5,000.

The prize is awarded annually in the categories of: Blog,  Book, Broadcast, Magazine, Newspaper, and Photography

Sidney Award

The Sidney Award  is a monthly journalism award given out by the foundation for work published in an American magazine, newspaper, on a news site or a blog, a broadcast by an American television or radio new outlet, or a published photography series. The award was first given in 2009.

The Foundation announces the winner on the 10th day of each month. Recipients are awarded $500, a bottle of union-made wine, and a certificate designed especially for the Sidney by New Yorker cartoonist Edward Sorel.

References

External links
 Hillman Prize website
 Sidney Prize website

American journalism organizations
Charities based in New York City
Organizations based in New York City
Organizations established in 1946
1946 establishments in New York (state)